Facundo Ferrero (born 5 March 1995) is an Argentine footballer who plays as a goalkeeper for Sarmiento.

Career

Club
Ferrero's career began in 2012 with Primera B Nacional team Deportivo Merlo, he appeared on the club's substitutes bench throughout 2012–13 in matches against Almirante Brown, Gimnasia y Esgrima and Rosario Central but was unused; Merlo were relegated in that season to Primera B Metropolitana. Ferrero made his professional debut on 25 May 2014 in a home league defeat to Fénix. Over the next year, Ferrero played a total of nine more games for the club. In January 2016, Ferrero joined Chacarita Juniors of Primera B Nacional. Despite being on the bench nineteen times in 2016–17, Ferrero left in July 2018 following zero appearances.

Primera B Metropolitana's Atlanta signed Ferrero soon after his release from Chacarita Juniors.

International
Ferrero was selected by the Argentina U23 squad for the 2016 Sait Nagjee Trophy. He featured in two matches, versus 1860 Munich II and Dnipro-2, as Argentina finished bottom of Group A. He also featured in a pre-tournament friendly against Deportivo Laferrere.

Career statistics
.

References

External links

1995 births
Living people
People from Moreno Partido
Argentine footballers
Association football goalkeepers
Sportspeople from Buenos Aires Province
Primera Nacional players
Primera B Metropolitana players
Deportivo Merlo footballers
Chacarita Juniors footballers
Club Atlético Atlanta footballers
Club Atlético Sarmiento footballers
Guillermo Brown de Puerto Madryn footballers